Orville Dahl (18 May 1910 - 11 September 1994) was an American academic. He was the first president of California Lutheran University in Thousand Oaks, California  from 1959-1962.

A graduate of St. Olaf College, he obtained his degree with honors in 1935 and stayed at his alma mater for the next seven years to direct the college's forensics program and to serve as the coach of the college football team. He continued his studies at University of Minnesota, Columbia University and the University of California at Berkeley where he obtained a doctorate degree in education administration. During World War II, he was an executive officer and commander in the U.S. Navy. He later became Dean of Administration at University of Vermont until he became Director of Higher Education for the Evangelical Lutheran Church, which had twelve schools and colleges. He also served as secretary of the National Lutheran Educational Conference for six years, and became president of California Lutheran College (CLC) in 1959.

Biography
Orville  Dahl was born at Duluth  in St. Louis County, Minnesota.  He was the son of Charles and Carrie Dahl. He graduated from St. Olaf College at Northfield, Minnesota.  He returned to his alma mater after graduate work at the University of Minnesota to serve as Assistant Dean of Men and Professor of Speech. He was Dean of Administration at the University of Vermont. During World War II, served as Commanding Office of Naval V-12 units in New England.

He came to Southern California from Minnesota in 1957 as a representative of the Evangelical Lutheran Church. The church wanted to build a liberal arts college in California, and sent Dahl to find a good location.

In 2003, Dr. Dahl was inducted into the California Lutheran University, Hall of Fame on a meritorious basis.  Orville Dahl Centrum Buildings are situated on the northwest side of campus of California Lutheran University.

References

External links
Orville Dahl Centrum Buildings, California Lutheran University

1994 deaths
1910 births
St. Olaf College alumni
University of Minnesota faculty
University of Vermont people
California Lutheran University faculty
Heads of universities and colleges in the United States
American Lutherans
People from Duluth, Minnesota
20th-century Lutherans
20th-century American academics